Sepidiina is a subtribe of darkling beetles in the family Tenebrionidae. There are about 8 genera and more than 110 described species in Sepidiina, found widely distributed in the Mediterranean area and Sub-Saharan Africa. Most species were described from the Horn of Africa.

Genera
These eight genera belong to the subtribe Sepidiina:
 Dimoniacis Koch, 1958
 Echinotus Solier, 1843
 Peringueyia Koch, 1958
 Sepidiopsis Gestro, 1892
 Sepidiostenus Fairmaire, 1884
 Sepidium Fabricius, 1775
 Vieta Laporte, 1840
 Vietomorpha Fairmaire, 1887

References

External links

 

Tenebrionoidea